Hyupsung University is a Christian private university in Hwaseong, South Korea.

The predecessor of Hyupsung University is Seoul Seminary, which opened in April 1977. In 1983, it was reorganized as Hyupsung Theological College in 1991 and then changed its name to Hyupsung Theological University in February 1993.

As of 2015, the faculties of the Collaborative College are theological colleges, the College of Humanities and Social Sciences, the College of Business Administration, the College of Science and Technology, the College of Arts and the College of Liberal Arts.

References

External links
 Official Website 

Hwaseong, Gyeonggi
Private universities and colleges in South Korea
Universities and colleges in Gyeonggi Province
Educational institutions established in 1977
1977 establishments in South Korea